A Woman, My Mother is a Canadian documentary film, directed by Claude Demers and released in 2019. The film documents Demers's efforts to learn more about his birth mother, who gave him up for adoption but later died before Demers ever had the opportunity to meet her as an adult, leaving him with many gaps in his understanding that he could fill in only with imaginative speculation.

The film premiered in November 2019 at the Montreal International Documentary Festival, where it won the award for Best Canadian Feature. It went into theatrical release in Quebec in early 2020, and was screened as part of the 2020 Hot Docs Canadian International Documentary Festival.

The film received two Prix Iris nominations at the 22-A Quebec Cinema Awards in 2020, for Best Editing in a Documentary (Natalie Lamoureux) and Best Sound in a Documentary (Luc Boudrias and Patrice LeBlanc). At the 9th Canadian Screen Awards in 2021, it was nominated for Best Documentary and Best Editing in a Documentary (Lamoureux), and Lamoureux won the award for editing.

References

External links

2019 films
Canadian documentary films
Quebec films
Documentary films about adoption
2019 documentary films
2010s French-language films
French-language Canadian films
2010s Canadian films